Florida White House may refer to:
 Nixon's Florida White House, a compound in Key Biscayne, Florida, used by US President Richard Nixon
 Harry S. Truman Little White House, the winter residence of US President Truman for 175 days during 11 visits
 Mar-a-Lago, a resort and National Historic Landmark in Palm Beach, Florida, owned by Donald Trump since 1985 and used by him frequently during his US presidency

See also 
 List of residences of presidents of the United States